"Perfect 10" is a song by English pop rock band the Beautiful South, released on 21 September 1998 as the first single from their sixth studio album, Quench (1998). It debuted at number two on the UK Singles Chart, selling 89,000 copies during its first week of release, and is the band's last UK top-10 single to date. It received a platinum certification from the British Phonographic Industry in 2021 for sales and streams exceeding 600,000 units.

Recording contributions
As well as the contributions from band members, in the documentary Paul Heaton: From Hull to Heatongrad, songwriter Paul Heaton refers to contributions to the recording from Norman Cook and Paul Weller, who offered production assistance and rhythm guitar, respectively. Their contributions are also mentioned on the liner notes for Quench.

Analysis

The verses of the song—sung alternately by Paul Heaton and Jacqui Abbott—are made up of a series of innuendos using clothing sizes and penis length to illustrate a loving relationship between two people who don't conform to modern stereotypes of physical perfection. The male vocal shows that although his partner is a little on the large side ("but she wears a 12"), she is a 'perfect 10' in his eyes. He also states, "the anorexic chicks, the model 6, they don't hold no weight with me," preferring instead to, "hold something I can see."

Likewise, the female vocal references penis size in several places, suggesting that "XXL" is unnecessary ("Every penny don't fit the slot") and that even when all her partner has to offer is "a poor poor 4, there ain't no man can replace."

The chorus to the song is sung by both male and female vocals, and confirms the theme of a happy and accepting relationship beyond ideas of conventional beauty, with Heaton and Abbott stating:

Critical reception
Scottish newspaper Daily Record described the song as "great" and "bitter-sweet". Caroline Sullivan from The Guardian called it "jazzy", noting that "Heaton's sweet-voiced 'I love her body, 'specially the lines', has one of the tenderest lines on an album full of memorable bons mots." Adrian Thrills from Daily Mail declared it as "a rasping musical debate about sexual politics, neatly driven along by funky piano and honking sax". Ian Hyland from Sunday Mirror rated the song nine out of ten, adding, "The funkier sound is new but their observations on the important things in life are sharp as ever. Almost perfect." Johnny Dee from The Times remarked that it "manages to be both funny and touching at the same time."

Track listings
 UK CD1 and Australian CD single
 "Perfect 10"
 "If"
 "I'll Sail This Ship Alone"

 UK CD2
 "Perfect 10"
 "Loving Arms"
 "One Last Love Song"

 UK cassette single
 "Perfect 10"
 "If"

Personnel
Personnel are adapted from the Quench liner notes.

 Paul Heaton – writing, vocals, production
 Dave Rotheray – writing, guitar
 Jacqueline Abbott – vocals
 Dave Hemingway – vocals
 Sean Welch – bass
 David Stead – drums
 Paul Weller – additional guitar
 Damon Butcher – keyboards
 Gary Hammond – percussion
 Kick Horns – brass
 Norman Cook – rhythm consultant
 Jon Kelly – production
 John Brough – engineering, mixing

Charts

Weekly charts

Year-end charts

Certifications

In popular culture
"Perfect 10" was seen as a 'tour classic' by The Beautiful South and it has been stated by Dave Stead that, "There are certain songs you just can't leave out...I think we would be lynched if we didn't play "Keep It All In", "Don't Marry Her" and "Perfect 10"." This song also features in an episode of sitcom Phoenix Nights, where compere Jerry St Clair sings it in his own style. "Perfect 10" was the theme song of UK television series Fat Friends.

References

External links
 Perfect 10 song lyrics

1998 singles
1998 songs
The Beautiful South songs
Go! Discs singles
Mercury Records singles
Body image in popular culture
Songs written by David Rotheray
Songs written by Paul Heaton